FC Cherkasy-2 was a Ukrainian football team based in Cherkasy, Ukraine. The club has been featured regularly in the Ukrainian Second Division it serves as a junior team for the FC Dnipro Cherkasy franchise. Like most tributary teams, the best players are sent up to the senior team, meanwhile developing other players for further call-ups.

FC Dnipro Cherkasy
Cherkasy-2
Association football clubs established in 1955
Association football clubs disestablished in 2001
1955 establishments in Ukraine
2001 disestablishments in Ukraine
Cherkasy-2